Dayton is the sixth-largest city in the U.S. state of Ohio and the county seat of Montgomery County. A small part of the city extends into Greene County. The 2020 U.S. census estimate put the city population at 137,644, while Greater Dayton was estimated to be at 814,049 residents. The Combined Statistical Area (CSA) was 1,086,512. This makes Dayton the fourth-largest metropolitan area in Ohio and 73rd in the United States.

Ohio's borders are within  of roughly 60 percent of the country's population and manufacturing infrastructure, making the Dayton area a logistical centroid for manufacturers, suppliers, and shippers. Dayton also hosts significant research and development in fields like industrial, aeronautical, and astronautical engineering that have led to many technological innovations. Much of this innovation is due in part to Wright-Patterson Air Force Base and its place in the community. With the decline of heavy manufacturing, Dayton's businesses have diversified into a service economy that includes insurance and legal sectors as well as healthcare and government sectors.

Along with defense and aerospace, healthcare accounts for much of the Dayton area's economy. Hospitals in the Greater Dayton area have an estimated combined employment of nearly 32,000 and a yearly economic impact of $6.8 billion. It is estimated that Premier Health Partners, a hospital network, contributes more than $2 billion a year to the region through operating, employment, and capital expenditures. In 2011, Dayton was rated the #3 city in the nation by HealthGrades for excellence in healthcare.

Dayton is also noted for its association with aviation; the city is the birthplace of Orville Wright. Other well-known individuals born in the city include poet Paul Laurence Dunbar and entrepreneur John H. Patterson. Dayton is also known for its many patents, inventions, and inventors, most notably the Wright brothers' invention of powered flight. In 2007 Dayton was a part of the top 100 cities in America. In 2008, 2009, and 2010, Site Selection magazine ranked Dayton the #1 mid-sized metropolitan area in the nation for economic development. Also in 2010, Dayton was named one of the best places in the United States for college graduates to find a job.

History 
Dayton was founded on April 1, 1796, by 12 settlers known as the Thompson Party. They traveled in March from Cincinnati up the Great Miami River by pirogue and landed at what is now St. Clair Street, where they found two small camps of Native Americans. Among the Thompson Party was Benjamin Van Cleve, whose memoirs provide insights into the Ohio Valley's history. Two other groups traveling overland arrived several days later. The oldest surviving building is Newcom Tavern, which was used for various purposes, including housing Dayton's first church, which is still in existence.

In 1797, Daniel C. Cooper laid out Mad River Road, the first overland connection between Cincinnati and Dayton, opening the "Mad River Country" to settlement. Ohio was admitted into the Union in 1803, and the village of Dayton was incorporated in 1805 and chartered as a city in 1841. The city was named after Jonathan Dayton, a captain in the American Revolutionary War who signed the U.S. Constitution and owned a significant amount of land in the area. In 1827, construction on the Dayton–Cincinnati canal began, which would provide a better way to transport goods from Dayton to Cincinnati and contribute significantly to Dayton's economic growth during the 1800s.

Innovation 

Innovation led to business growth in the region. In 1884, John Henry Patterson acquired James Ritty's National Manufacturing Company along with his cash register patents and formed the National Cash Register Company (NCR). The company manufactured the first mechanical cash registers and played a crucial role in the shaping of Dayton's reputation as an epicenter for manufacturing in the early 1900s. In 1906, Charles F. Kettering, a leading engineer at the company, helped develop the first electric cash register, which propelled NCR into the national spotlight. NCR also helped develop the US Navy Bombe, a code-breaking machine that helped crack the Enigma machine cipher during World War II.

Dayton has been the home for many patents and inventions since the 1870s. According to the National Park Service, citing information from the U.S. Patent Office, Dayton had granted more patents per capita than any other U.S. city in 1890 and ranked fifth in the nation as early as 1870. The Wright brothers, inventors of the airplane, and Charles F. Kettering, world-renowned for his numerous inventions, hailed from Dayton. The city was also home to James Ritty's Incorruptible Cashier, the first mechanical cash register, and Arthur E. Morgan's hydraulic jump, a flood prevention mechanism that helped pioneer hydraulic engineering. Paul Laurence Dunbar, an African-American poet and novelist, penned his most famous works in the late 19th century and became an integral part of the city's history.

Birthplace of aviation 
Powered aviation began in Dayton. Orville and Wilbur Wright were the first to construct and demonstrate powered flight.

When the government tried to move development to Langley field in southern Virginia, six Dayton businessmen including Edward A. Deeds, formed the Dayton-Wright Airplane Company in Moraine and established a flying field. Deeds also opened a field to the north in the flood plain of the Great Miami River between the confluences of that river, the Stillwater River, and the Mad River, near downtown Dayton. Later named McCook Field for Alexander McDowell McCook, an American Civil War general, this became the Army Signal Corps' primary aviation research and training location. Wilbur Wright also purchased land near Huffman prairie to continue their research.

During World War I, the Army purchased 40 acres adjacent to Huffman Prairie for the Fairfield Aviation General Supply Depot. As airplanes developed more capability, they needed more runway space than McCook could offer, and a new location was sought. Wright Field was "formally dedicated" on October 12, 1927. After World War II, Wright Field and the adjacent Patterson Field, Dayton Army Air Field, and Clinton Army Air Field were merged as the Headquarters, Air Force Technical Base. On January 13, 1948, the facility was renamed Wright-Patterson Air Force Base.

Great Dayton Flood 
A catastrophic flood in March 1913, known as the Great Dayton Flood, led to the creation of the Miami Conservancy District, a series of dams as well as hydraulic pumps installed around Dayton, in 1914.

The war effort 
Like other cities across the country, Dayton was heavily involved in the war effort during World War II. Several locations around the city hosted the Dayton Project, a branch of the larger Manhattan Project, to develop polonium triggers used in early atomic bombs. The war efforts led to a manufacturing boom throughout the city, including high demand for housing and other services. At one point, emergency housing was put into place due to a housing shortage in the region, much of which is still in use today.

Alan Turing is widely considered to be the father of theoretical computer science and artificial intelligence. He visited the National Cash Register (NCR) company in Dayton in December 1942. He was able to show that it was not necessary to build 336 Bombes, so the initial order was scaled down to 96 machines to decipher German Enigma-machine-encrypted secret messages during World War II.

Post-war Dayton 
Between the 1940s and the 1970s, the city saw significant growth in suburban areas from population migration. Veterans were returning from military service in large numbers seeking industrial and manufacturing jobs, a part of the local industry that was expanding rapidly. Advancements in architecture also contributed to the suburban boom. New, modernized shopping centers and the Interstate Highway System allowed workers to commute greater distances and families to live further from the downtown area. More than 127,000 homes were built in Montgomery County during the 1950s.

During this time, the city was the site of several race riots, including one in 1955 following the murder of Emmett Till, the 1966 Dayton race riot, two in 1967 (following a speech by civil rights activist H. Rap Brown and another following the police killing of an African American man), and one in 1968 as part of the nationwide King assassination riots.

Since the 1980s, however, Dayton's population has declined, mainly due to the loss of manufacturing jobs and decentralization of metropolitan areas, as well as the national housing crisis that began in 2008. While much of the state has suffered for similar reasons, the impact on Dayton has been greater than most. Dayton had the third-greatest percentage loss of population in the state since the 1980s, behind Cleveland and Youngstown. Despite this, Dayton has begun diversifying its workforce from manufacturing into other growing sectors such as healthcare and education.

Peace accords 

In 1995, the Dayton Agreement, a peace accord between the parties to the hostilities of the conflict in Bosnia-Herzegovina and the former Yugoslavia, was negotiated at Wright-Patterson Air Force Base, near Fairborn, Ohio, from November 1 to 21.

Richard Holbrooke wrote about these events in his memoirs:

 There was also a real Dayton out there, a charming Ohio city, famous as the birthplace of the Wright brothers. Its citizens energized us from the outset. Unlike the population of, say, New York City, Geneva or Washington, which would scarcely notice another conference, Daytonians were proud to be part of history. Large signs at the commercial airport hailed Dayton as the "temporary center of international peace." The local newspapers and television stations covered the story from every angle, drawing the people deeper into the proceedings. When we ventured into a restaurant or a shopping center downtown, people crowded around, saying that they were praying for us. Warren Christopher was given at least one standing ovation in a restaurant. Families on the airbase placed "candles of peace" in their front windows, and people gathered in peace vigils outside the base. One day they formed a "peace chain," although it was not large enough to surround the sprawling eight-thousand-acre base. Ohio's famous ethnic diversity was on display.

2000s initiatives 
Downtown expansion that began in the 2000s has helped revitalize the city and encourage growth. Day Air Ballpark, home of the Dayton Dragons, was built in 2000. The highly successful minor league baseball team has been an integral part of Dayton's culture. In 2001, the city's public park system, Five Rivers MetroParks, built RiverScape MetroPark, an outdoor entertainment venue that attracts more than 400,000 visitors each year. A new performance arts theater, the Schuster Center, opened in 2003. A large health network in the region, Premier Health Partners, expanded its Miami Valley Hospital with a 12-story tower addition.

In 2010, the Downtown Dayton Partnership, in cooperation with the City of Dayton and community leaders, introduced the Greater Downtown Dayton Plan. It focuses on job creation and retention, infrastructure improvements, housing, recreation, and collaboration. The plan is to be implemented through the year 2020.

Nickname 

Dayton is known as the "Gem City". The nickname's origin is uncertain, but several theories exist. In the early 19th century, a well-known racehorse named Gem hailed from Dayton. In 1845, an article published in the Cincinnati Daily Chronicle by an author known as T stated:

In the late 1840s, Major William D. Bickham of the Dayton Journal began a campaign to nickname Dayton the "Gem City." The name was adopted by the city's Board of Trade several years later. Paul Laurence Dunbar referred to the nickname in his poem, "Toast to Dayton", as noted in the following excerpt:

She shall ever claim our duty,
For she shines—the brightest gem
That has ever decked with beauty
     Dear Ohio's diadem.

Dayton also plays a role in a nickname given to the state of Ohio, "Birthplace of Aviation." Dayton is the hometown of the Wright brothers, aviation pioneers who are credited with inventing and building the first practical airplane in history. After their first manned flights in Kitty Hawk, North Carolina, which they had chosen due to its ideal weather and climate conditions, the Wrights returned to Dayton and continued testing at nearby Huffman Prairie.

Additionally, Dayton is colloquially referred to as "Little Detroit". This nickname comes from Dayton's prominence as a Midwestern manufacturing center.

Geography 

Climate 
Dayton's climate features warm, muggy summers and cold, dry winters, and is classified as a humid continental climate (Köppen Dfa).

On average, there are 14 days of + highs and 4.5 nights of sub- lows annually. Precipitation averages  annually, with total rainfall peaking in May.

Dayton is subject to severe weather typical of the Midwestern United States. Tornadoes are possible from the spring to the fall. Floods, blizzards, and severe thunderstorms can also occur.

On Memorial Day of 2019, Dayton suffered extensive property damage and one death during a tornado outbreak, in which a total of 15 tornadoes touched down in the Dayton area. Although some of the tornadoes were only EF0 and remained on the ground for less than a mile, one was an EF4 measuring a half-mile-wide (805 meters), which tore through the communities of Brookville, Trotwood, Dayton, and Riverside. Several streets were closed, including portions of I-75 and North Dixie Street. 64,000 residents lost power and much of the region's water supply was cut off.

Ecology 
The Dayton Audubon Society is the National Audubon Society's local chapter. The Dayton chapter manages local activities contributing to the annual, hemisphere-wide Christmas Bird Count. The Chapter began participation in the National Count in 1924. The local Count was initially coordinated by Ben Blincoe, who was succeeded by Jim Hill in 1970. In the mid-1960s, the freezing of Lake Erie and associated marshlands led species of waterfowl to appear in the Dayton-area, where surface waters remained unfrozen. Nine varieties of birds have been observed every year in the Dayton area: downy woodpecker, Carolina chickadee, tufted titmouse, brown creeper, cardinal, junco, tree sparrow, song sparrow and crow.

Demographics 

Note: the following demographic information applies only to the city of Dayton proper. For other Dayton-area communities, see their respective articles.

Dayton's population declined significantly from a peak of 262,332 residents in 1960 to only 141,759 in 2010. This was in part due to the slowdown of the region's manufacturing and the growth of Dayton's affluent suburbs including Oakwood, Englewood, Beavercreek, Springboro, Miamisburg, Kettering, and Centerville. The city's most populous ethnic group, white, declined from 78.1% in 1960 to 51.7% by 2010. Recent census estimates show a population decline since 2010.

As of the 2000 census, the median income for a household in the city was $27,523, and the median income for a family was $34,978. Males had a median income of $30,816 versus $24,937 for females. The per capita income for the city was $34,724. About 18.2% of families and 23.0% of the population were below the poverty line, including 32.0% of those under age 18 and 15.3% of those age 65 or over.

2010 census 
As of the 2010 census, there were 141,759 people, 58,404 households, and 31,064 families residing in the city. The racial makeup of the city was 51.7% White, 42.9% African American, 0.3% Native American, 0.9% Asian, 1.3% from other races, and 2.9% from two or more races. Hispanic or Latino of any race were 3.0% of the population.

There were 58,404 households, of which 28.3% had children under the age of 18 living with them, 25.9% were married couples living together, 21.4% had a female householder with no husband present, 5.9% had a male householder with no wife present, and 46.8% were non-families. 38.8% of all households were made up of individuals, and 11.2% had someone living alone who was 65 years of age or older. The average household size was 2.26, and the average family size was 3.03.

The median age in the city was 34.4 years. 22.9% of residents were under the age of 18; 14.2% were between the ages of 18 and 24; 25.3% were from 25 to 44; 25.8% were from 45 to 64, and 11.8% were 65 years of age or older. The gender makeup of the city was 48.7% male and 51.3% female.

2013 census population estimates 
The 2013 census population estimate showed a slight Dayton population increase for the first time in five decades. However, the 2014 population estimate indicated a decrease of individuals from 2013's estimate.

Economy 

Dayton's economy is relatively diversified and vital to the overall economy of the state of Ohio. In 2008 and 2009, Site Selection magazine ranked Dayton the #1 medium-sized metropolitan area in the U.S. for economic development. Dayton is also among the top 100 metropolitan areas in both exports and export-related jobs, ranked 16 and 14 respectively by the Brookings Institution. The 2010 report placed the value of exports at $4.7 billion and the number of export-related jobs at 44,133. The Dayton Metropolitan Statistical Area ranks 4th in Ohio's Gross Domestic Product with a 2008 industry total of $33.78 billion. Additionally, Dayton ranks third among 11 major metropolitan areas in Ohio for exports to foreign countries. The Dayton Development Coalition is attempting to leverage the region's large water capacity, estimated to be 1.5 trillion gallons of renewable water aquifers, to attract new businesses. Moody's Investment Services revised Dayton's bond rating from A1 to the stronger rating of Aa2 as part of its global recalibration process. Standard & Poor's upgraded Dayton's rating from A+ to AA- in the summer of 2009.

Bloomberg Businessweek ranked Dayton in 2010 as one of the best places in the U.S. for college graduates looking for a job. Companies such as Reynolds and Reynolds, CareSource, DP&L (soon AES inc), LexisNexis, Kettering Health Network, Premier Health Partners, and Standard Register have their headquarters in Dayton. It is also the former home of the Speedwell Motor Car Company, MeadWestvaco (formerly known as the Mead Paper Company), and NCR. NCR was headquartered in Dayton for over 125 years and was a major innovator in computer technology.

Research, development, aerospace and aviation 

The Dayton region gave birth to aviation and is known for its high concentration of aerospace and aviation technology. In 2009, Governor Ted Strickland designated Dayton as Ohio's aerospace innovation hub, the state's first such technology hub. Two major United States research and development organizations have leveraged Dayton's historical leadership in aviation and maintain their headquarters in the area: The National Air and Space Intelligence Center (NASIC) and the Air Force Research Laboratory (AFRL). Both have their headquarters at Wright-Patterson Air Force Base.

Several research organizations support NASIC, AFRL, and the Dayton community. The Advanced Technical Intelligence Center is a confederation of government, academic, and industry partners. The University of Dayton Research Institute (UDRI) is led by the University of Dayton. The Cognitive Technologies Division (CTD) of Applied Research Associates, Inc., which carries out human-centered research and design, is headquartered in the Dayton suburb of Fairborn. The city of Dayton has started Tech Town, a development project to attract technology-based firms and revitalize the downtown area. Tech Town is home to the world's first RFID business incubator. The University of Dayton–led Institute for Development & Commercialization of Sensor Technologies (IDCAST) at TechTown is a center for remote sensing and sensing technology. It is one of Dayton's technology business incubators housed in The Entrepreneurs Center building.

Healthcare 

The Kettering Health Network and Premier Health Partners have a major role on the Dayton area's economy. Hospitals in the Greater Dayton area have an estimated combined employment of nearly 32,000 and a yearly economic impact of $6.8 billion. In addition, several Dayton area hospitals consistently earn top national ranking and recognition including the U.S. News & World Reports list of "America's Best Hospitals" as well as many of HealthGrades top ratings. The most notable hospitals are Miami Valley Hospital and Kettering Medical Center.

The Dayton region has several key institutes and centers for health care. The Center for Tissue Regeneration and Engineering at Dayton focuses on the science and development of human tissue regeneration. The National Center for Medical Readiness (NCMR) is also in the Dayton area. The center includes Calamityville, which is a disaster training facility. Over five years, Calamityville is estimated to have a regional economic impact of $374 million. Also, the Neurological Institute at Miami Valley Hospital is an institute focused on the diagnosis, treatment, and research of neurological disorders.

Top employers 
According to the city's 2019 Comprehensive Annual Financial Report, the top employers in the city proper are:

Government 

The Dayton City Commission is composed of the mayor and four city commissioners. Each city commission member is elected at-large on a non-partisan basis for four-year, overlapping terms. All policy items are decided by the city commission, which is empowered by the City Charter to pass ordinances and resolutions, adopt regulations, and appoint the city manager. The city manager is responsible for budgeting and implementing policies and initiatives. Dayton was the first large American city to adopt the city manager form of municipal government, in 1913.

Cityscape

Architecture 

Unlike many Midwestern cities its age, Dayton has very broad and straight downtown streets (generally two or three full lanes in each direction) that improved access to the downtown even after the automobile became popular. The main reason for the broad streets was that Dayton was a marketing and shipping center from its beginning; streets were broad to enable wagons drawn by teams of three to four pairs of oxen to turn around. Also, some of today's streets were once barge canals flanked by draw-paths.

A courthouse building was built in downtown Dayton in 1888 to supplement Dayton's original Neoclassical courthouse, which still stands. This second, "new" courthouse has since been replaced with new facilities as well as a park. The Old Court House has been a favored political campaign stop. On September 17, 1859, Abraham Lincoln delivered an address on its steps. Eight other presidents have visited the courthouse, either as presidents or during presidential campaigns: Andrew Johnson, James Garfield, John F. Kennedy, Lyndon B. Johnson, Richard Nixon, Gerald Ford, Ronald Reagan, and Bill Clinton.

The Dayton Arcade, which opened on March 3, 1904, was built in the hopes of replacing open-air markets throughout the city. Throughout the decades, the Arcade has gone through many transformations but has retained its charm. Some of its main features include a Flemish facade at the Third Street entrance, a glass dome above the Arcade rotunda, and a chateau roof line above the Third Street facade. The Dayton Arcade is currently under renovations with no official completion date set.

In 2009, the CareSource Management Group finished construction of a $55 million corporate headquarters in downtown Dayton. The , 10-story building was downtown's first new office tower in more than a decade.

Kettering Tower was originally Winters Tower, the headquarters of Winters Bank. The building was renamed after Virginia Kettering when Winters was merged into Bank One. KeyBank Tower was known as the MeadWestvaco Tower before KeyBank gained naming rights to the building in 2008.

Ted Rall said in 2015 that over the last five decades Dayton has been demolishing some of its architecturally significant buildings to reduce the city's rental vacancy rate and thus increase the occupancy rate.

Neighborhoods 
Dayton's ten historic neighborhoods—Oregon District, Wright Dunbar, Dayton View, Grafton Hill, McPherson Town, Webster Station, Huffman, Kenilworth, St. Anne's Hill, and South Park—feature mostly single-family houses and mansions in the Neoclassical, Jacobethan, Tudor Revival, English Gothic, Chateauesque, Craftsman, Queen Anne, Georgian Revival, Colonial Revival, Renaissance Revival Architecture, Shingle Style Architecture, Prairie, Mission Revival, Eastlake/Italianate, American Foursquare, and Federal styles. Downtown Dayton is also a large area that encompasses several neighborhoods itself and has seen a recent uplift and revival.

Suburbs 

Dayton's suburbs with a population of 10,000 or more include Beavercreek, Centerville, Clayton, Englewood, Fairborn, Harrison Township, Huber Heights, Kettering, Miami Township, Miamisburg, Oakwood, Riverside, Springboro, Trotwood, Vandalia, Washington Township, West Carrollton, and Xenia.

In the federal government's National Urban Policy and New Community Development Act of 1970, funding was provided for thirteen "new towns" or planned cities throughout the country. One location was set to become a suburb of Dayton and was known variously as Brookwood or Newfields. The goal was to have an entirely new suburb that would eventually house about 35,000 residents. The new town was to be located between Trotwood and Brookville, and modeled on the ideas of Ian McHarg. The project was abandoned in 1978 and most of the land became Sycamore State Park.

Recreation 
Dayton was named National Geographic's outdoor adventure capital of the Midwest in 2019 due in large part to the metropolitan area's revitalized Five Rivers MetroPark, extensive bicycle and jogging trail system, urban green spaces, lakes and camping areas.

Bicycling 

In cooperation with the Miami Conservancy District, Five Rivers MetroParks hosts 340 miles of paved trails, the largest network of paved off-street trails in the United States. The regional trail system represents over 35% of the 900 miles in Ohio's off-street trail network. In 2010, the city of Troy was named "bike friendly" by the League of American Bicyclists, which gave the city the organization's bronze designation. The honorable mention made Dayton one of two cities in Ohio to receive the award, the other being Columbus, and one of 15 cities nationwide.

Culture

Fine arts 

The Dayton Region ranked within the top 10% in the nation in arts and culture. In a 2012 readers' poll by American Style magazine, Dayton ranked #2 in the country among mid-size cities as an arts destination, ranking higher than larger cities such as Atlanta, St. Louis, and Cincinnati. Dayton is the home of the Dayton Art Institute.

The Benjamin and Marian Schuster Performing Arts Center in downtown Dayton is a world-class performing arts center and the home venue of the Dayton Philharmonic Orchestra, Dayton Opera, and the Dayton Ballet. In addition to philharmonic and opera performances, the Schuster Center hosts concerts, lectures, and traveling Broadway shows, and is a popular spot for weddings and other events. The historic Victoria Theatre in downtown Dayton hosts concerts, traveling Broadway shows, ballet, a summertime classic film series, and more. The Loft Theatre, also downtown, is the home of the Human Race Theatre Company. The Dayton Playhouse, in West Dayton, is the site of numerous plays and theatrical productions. Between 1957 and 1995, the Kenley Players presented live theater productions in Dayton. In 2013, John Kenley was inducted into the Dayton Theatre Hall of Fame.

Dayton is the home to several ballet companies including:
 The Dayton Ballet, one of the oldest professional dance companies in the United States. The Dayton Ballet runs the Dayton Ballet School, the oldest dance school in Dayton and one of the oldest in the country. It is the only ballet school in the Miami Valley associated with a professional dance company.
 The Dayton Contemporary Dance Company (established in 1968), which hosts the largest repertory of African-American-based contemporary dance in the world. The company travels nationally and internationally and has been recognized by critics worldwide.

Front Street, the largest artists' collective in Dayton, is housed in three industrial buildings on East Second Street.

Food 

The city's fine dining restaurants include The Pine Club, a nationally known steakhouse.  Dayton is home to a variety of pizza chains that have become woven into local culture, the most notable of which are Cassano's and Marion's Piazza. Notable Dayton-based restaurant chains include Hot Head Burritos.

In addition to restaurants, the city is also home to Esther Price Candies, a candy and chocolate company, and Mike-sells, the oldest potato chip company in the United States.

The city began developing a reputation for its number of breweries and craft beer venues by the late 2010s.

Religion 

Many major religions are represented in Dayton. Christianity is represented in Dayton by dozens of denominations and their respective churches. Notable Dayton churches include the First Lutheran Church, Sacred Heart Church, and Ginghamsburg Church. Dayton's Muslim community is largely represented by the Islamic Society of Greater Dayton (ISGD), a Muslim community that includes a mosque on Josie Street. Dayton is also home to the United Theological Seminary, one of 13 seminaries affiliated with the United Methodist Church. Judaism is represented by Temple Israel. Hinduism is represented by the Hindu Temple of Dayton. Old North Dayton also has a number of Catholic churches built by immigrants from Lithuania, Poland, Hungary, and Germany.

Tourism 
Tourism also accounts for one out of every 14 private sector jobs in the county. Tourism in the Dayton region is led by the National Museum of the United States Air Force at Wright-Patterson Air Force Base, the largest and oldest military aviation museum in the world. The museum draws over 1.3 million visitors per year and is one of the most-visited tourist attractions in Ohio. The museum houses the National Aviation Hall of Fame.

Other museums also play significant roles in the tourism and economy of the Dayton area. The Dayton Art Institute, a museum of fine arts, owns collections containing more than 20,000 objects spanning 5,000 years of art and archaeological history. The Dayton Art Institute was rated one of the top 10 best art museums in the United States for children. The Boonshoft Museum of Discovery is a children's museum of science with numerous exhibits, one of which includes an indoor zoo with nearly 100 different animals.

There are also some notable historical museums in the region. The Dayton Aviation Heritage National Historical Park, operated by the National Park Service, commemorates the lives and achievements of Dayton natives Orville and Wilbur Wright and Paul Laurence Dunbar. The Wright brothers' famous Wright Flyer III aircraft is housed in a museum at Carillon Historical Park. Dayton is also home to America's Packard Museum, which contains many restored historical Packard vehicles. SunWatch Indian Village/Archaeological Park, a partially reconstructed 12th-century prehistoric American Indian village, is on the south end of Dayton; it is organized around a central plaza dominated by wood posts forming an astronomical calendar. The park includes a museum where visitors can learn about the Indian history of the Miami Valley.

Music & Entertainment 

The Vectren Dayton Air Show is an annual air show that takes place at the Dayton International Airport. The Vectren Dayton Airshow is one of the largest air shows in the United States.

The Dayton area is served by Five Rivers MetroParks, encompassing  over 23 facilities for year-round recreation, education, and conservation.

Dayton was home to a thriving funk music scene from the 1970s to the early 1980s, that included bands such as Ohio Players, Roger Troutman & Zapp, Lakeside, Sun, Dayton, Heatwave, and Slave.

Dayton was also the birthplace to several influential indie and punk bands such as The Breeders, Guided by Voices, and Brainiac. 

From 1996 to 1998, Dayton hosted the National Folk Festival. Since then, the annual Cityfolk Festival has continued to bring folk, ethnic, and world music and arts to Dayton. The Five Rivers MetroParks also owns and operates the PNC Second Street Market near downtown Dayton.

The Dayton area hosts several arenas and venues. South of Dayton in Kettering is the Fraze Pavilion, whose notable performances have included the Backstreet Boys, Boston, and Steve Miller Band. South of downtown, on the banks of the Great Miami River, is the University of Dayton Arena, home venue for the University of Dayton Flyers basketball teams and the location of various other events and concerts. It also hosts the Winter Guard International championships, at which hundreds of percussion and color guard ensembles from around the world compete. In addition, the Dayton Amateur Radio Association hosts the annual Dayton Hamvention, North America's largest hamfest, at the Greene County Fairgrounds in nearby Xenia. The Nutter Center, which is just east of Dayton in the suburb of Fairborn, is the home arena for athletics of Wright State University and the former Dayton Bombers hockey team. This venue is used for many concerts, community events, and various national traveling shows and performances.

The Oregon District is a historic residential and commercial district in southeast downtown Dayton. The district is populated with art galleries, specialty shops, pubs, nightclubs, and coffee houses.

The city of Dayton is also host to yearly festivals, such as the Dayton Celtic Festival, the Dayton Blues Festival, Dayton Music Fest, Urban Nights, Women in Jazz, the African American and Cultural Festival, and the Dayton Reggae Fest.

Sports 
The Dayton area is home to several minor league and semi pro teams, as well as NCAA Division I sports programs.

Baseball 
The Dayton Dragons professional baseball team is a Class A minor league affiliate for the Cincinnati Reds. The Dayton Dragons are the first (and only) team in minor league baseball history to sell out an entire season before it began and was voted as one of the top 10 hottest tickets to get in all of professional sports by Sports Illustrated. The Dayton Dragons 815 consecutive sellouts surpassed the NBA's Portland Trail Blazers for the longest sellout streak across all professional sports in the U.S.

Collegiate 

The University of Dayton and Wright State University both host NCAA basketball. The University of Dayton Arena has hosted more games in the NCAA men's basketball tournament over its history than any other venue. UD Arena is also the site of the First Round games of the NCAA Tournament. In 2012, eight teams competed for the final four spots in the NCAA basketball tournament. Wright State University's NCAA men's basketball is the Wright State Raiders and the University of Dayton's NCAA men's basketball team is the Dayton Flyers.

Hockey 
The Dayton Gems were a minor league ice hockey team in the International Hockey League from 1964 to 1977, 1979 to 1980, and most recently 2009 to 2012.

The Dayton Bombers were an ECHL ice hockey team from 1991 to 2009. They most recently played the North Division of the ECHL's American Conference. In June 2009, it was announced the Bombers would turn in their membership back to the league.

Despite the folding of the Bombers, hockey remained in Dayton as the Dayton Gems of the International Hockey League were formed in the fall of 2009 at Hara Arena. The Gems folded after the 2011–12 season. Shortly after the Gems folded, it was announced a new team, the Dayton Demonz, would begin play in 2012 in the Federal Hockey League (FHL). The Demonz folded in 2015 and were immediately replaced by the Dayton Demolition, also in the FHL. However, the Demolition would cease operations after only one season when Hara Arena decided to close due to financial difficulties.

Football 
Dayton hosted the first American Professional Football Association game (precursor to the NFL). The game was played at Triangle Park between the Dayton Triangles and the Columbus Panhandles on October 3, 1920, and is considered one of the first professional football games ever played. Football teams in the Dayton area include the Dayton Flyers and the Dayton Sharks.

Golf 
The Dayton region is also known for the many golf courses and clubs that it hosts. The Miami Valley Golf Club, Moraine Country Club, NCR Country Club, and the Pipestone Golf Course are some of the more notable courses. Also, several PGA Championships have been held at area golf courses. The Miami Valley Golf Club hosted the 1957 PGA Championship, the Moraine Country Club hosted the 1945 PGA Championship, and the NCR Country club hosted the 1969 PGA Championship. Additionally, NCR CC hosted the 1986 U.S. Women's Open and the 2005 U.S. Senior Open. Other notable courses include the Yankee Trace Golf Club, the Beavercreek Golf Club, Dayton Meadowbrook Country Club, Sycamore Creek Country Club, Heatherwoode Golf Club, Community Golf Course, and Kitty Hawk Golf Course.

Rugby 
The city of Dayton is the home to the Dayton Area Rugby Club which hosts their home games at the Dayton Rugby Grounds. As of 2018, the club fields two men's and one women's side for Rugby Union and several Rugby Sevens sides. The club also hosts the annual Gem City 7's tournament.

Media

Newspapers 
Dayton is served in print by The Dayton Daily News, the city's sole remaining daily newspaper. The Dayton Daily News is owned by Cox Enterprises. The Dayton region's main business newspaper is the Dayton Business Journal. The Dayton City Paper, a community paper focused on music, art, and independent thought ceased operation in 2018. The Dayton Weekly News has been published since 1993, providing news and information to Dayton's African-American community.

Magazines 
There are numerous magazines produced in and for the Dayton region.  The Dayton Magazine provides insight into arts, food, and events.  Focus on Business is published by the Chamber of Commerce to provide awareness of companies and initiatives affecting the regional economy

Television 
Nielsen Media Research ranked the 11-county Dayton television market as the No. 62 market in the United States. The market is served by stations affiliated with major American networks including: WDTN, channel 2 – NBC, operated by Nexstar Media Group; WHIO-TV, channel 7 – CBS, operated by Cox Media Group; WPTD, channel 16 – PBS, operated by ThinkTV, which also operates WPTO, assigned to Oxford; WKEF, channel 22 – ABC/Fox, operated by Sinclair Broadcasting; WBDT, channel 26 – The CW, operated by Vaughan Media (a shell corporation of Nexstar), assigned to Springfield; WKOI-TV, channel 43 – Ion Television, assigned to Richmond, Indiana; and WRGT-TV, channel 45 – My Network TV, operated under a local marketing agreement by Sinclair Broadcasting. The nationally syndicated morning talk show The Daily Buzz originated from WBDT, the former ACME Communications property in Miamisburg, before moving to its current home in Florida.

Radio 
Dayton is also served by 42 AM and FM radio stations directly, and numerous other stations are heard from elsewhere in southwest Ohio, which serve outlying suburbs and adjoining counties.

Transportation

Public transit 

The Greater Dayton Regional Transit Authority (RTA) operates public bus routes in the Dayton metro area. In addition to routes covered by traditional diesel-powered buses, RTA has several electric trolley bus routes. The Dayton trolleybus system is the second longest-running of the five remaining trolleybus systems in the U.S., having entered service in 1933. It is the present manifestation of an electric transit service that has operated continuously in Dayton since 1888.

Dayton operates a Greyhound Station which provides inter-city bus transportation to and from Dayton. The hub is in the Greater Dayton Regional Transit Authority North-West hub in Trotwood.

Airports 

Dayton International Airport lies in a northern exclave of the city and offers service to 21 markets through 10 airlines. In 2008, it served 2.9 million passengers. The Dayton International Airport is also a significant regional air freight hub hosting FedEx Express, UPS Airlines, United States Postal Service, and major commercial freight carriers.

The Dayton area also has several regional airports. It serves as the reliever airport for Dayton International Airport. The airport primarily serves corporate and personal aircraft users.

Major highways 
The Dayton region is primarily served by three interstates:
 Interstate 75 runs north to south through the city of Dayton and many of Dayton's north and south suburbs, including Kettering and Centerville south of Dayton and Vandalia, Tipp City, and Troy north of Dayton.
 Interstate 70 is a major east–west interstate that runs through many of Dayton's east and west suburbs, including Huber Heights, Butler Township, Englewood, and Brookville, and intersects with I-75 in Vandalia, Ohio, just north of the city. This intersection of I-70 and I-75 is also known as "Freedom Veterans Crossroads", which was officially named by the U.S. Department of Transportation in 2004. I-70 is the major route to the airport.
 Interstate 675 is a partial interstate ring on the southeastern and eastern suburbs of Dayton. It runs northeast to south and connects to I-70 to the northeast and I-75 to the south.

Other major routes for the region include:
 US 35 is a major limited access east–west highway that bisects the city. It is most widely used between Drexel and Xenia.
 Route 40 is a major east–west highway that runs parallel to (and 2 miles north of) I-70
 State Route 4 is a freeway that is most heavily traveled between I-75 and I-70.
 State Route 444 is north–south state highway. Its southern terminus is at its interchange with Route 4, and its northern terminus is at Interstate 675. This limited-access road serves Dayton and Fairborn and is a significant route to access points serving Wright-Patterson Air Force Base.

From 2010 through 2017, the Ohio Department of Transportation (ODOT) performed a $533 million construction project to modify, reconstruct and widen I-75 through downtown Dayton, from Edwin C Moses Blvd. to Stanley Avenue.

Rail 
Dayton hosts several inter-modal freight railroad terminals. Two Class I railroads, CSX and Norfolk Southern Railway, operate switching yards in the city.

Formerly the Baltimore & Ohio Railroad, New York Central Railroad and the Pennsylvania Railroad, and afterward, Amtrak made long-distance passenger train stops at Dayton Union Station on S. Sixth Street. The last train leaving there was the National Limited in October 1979.

Education

Public schools 
Dayton Public Schools operates 34 schools that serve 16,855 students, including:
 Belmont High
 Meadowdale High
 Paul Laurence Dunbar High
 Ponitz Career Technology Center
 Stivers School for the Arts
 Thurgood Marshall High

Private schools 
The city of Dayton has more than 35 private schools within the city, including:
 Archbishop Alter High School
 Carroll High School
 Chaminade Julienne Catholic High School
 Dayton Christian School
 Dominion Academy of Dayton
 The Miami Valley School
 Spring Valley Academy

Charter schools 
Dayton has 33 charter schools. Three of the top five charter schools named in 2011 are K–8 schools managed by National Heritage Academies. Notable charter schools include:
 Dayton Early College Academy
 Emerson Academy
 North Dayton School of Discovery
 Pathway School of Discovery
 Richard Allen Schools

Colleges and universities 

The Dayton area was ranked tenth for higher education among metropolitan areas in the United States by Forbes in 2009. The city is home to two major universities. The University of Dayton is a private, Catholic institution founded in 1850 by the Marianist order. It has the only American Bar Association (ABA)-approved law school in the Dayton area. The University of Dayton is Ohio's largest private university and is also home to the University of Dayton Research Institute, which ranks third in the nation for sponsored materials research, and the Center for Tissue Regeneration and Engineering at Dayton, which focuses on human tissue regeneration.

The public Wright State University became a state university in 1967. Wright State University established the National Center for Medical Readiness, a national training program for disaster preparedness and relief. Wright State's Boonshoft School of Medicine is the Dayton area's only medical school and is a leader in biomedical research.

Dayton is also home to Sinclair Community College, the largest community college at a single location in Ohio and one of the nation's largest community colleges. Sinclair is acclaimed as one of the country's best community colleges. Sinclair was founded as the YMCA college in 1887.

Other schools just outside Dayton that shape the educational landscape are Antioch College and Antioch University, both in Yellow Springs, Central State University in Wilberforce, Kettering College of Medical Arts and School of Advertising Art in Kettering, DeVry University in Beavercreek, Cedarville University, Clark State Community College and Wittenberg University in Springfield. The Air Force Institute of Technology, which was founded in 1919 and serves as a graduate school for the United States Air Force, is at the nearby Wright-Patterson Air Force Base.

Institutions 
 Boonshoft School of Medicine
 Dayton Art Institute
 Ohio Institute of Photography and Technology
 School of Advertising Art
 Wright State University

Crime 
 
Dayton's crime declined between 2003 and 2008 in key categories according to FBI Uniform Crime Reports and Dayton Police Department data. In 2009, crime continued to fall in the city of Dayton. Crime in the categories of forcible rape, aggravated assault, property crime, motor vehicle theft, robbery, burglary, theft and arson all showed declines for 2009. Overall, crime in Dayton dropped 40% over the previous year. The Dayton Police Department reported a total of 39 murders in 2016, which marked a 39.3% increase in homicides from 2015.

John Dillinger, a bank robber during the early 1930s, was captured and arrested by Dayton city police while visiting his girlfriend at a high-class boarding house in downtown Dayton.

On August 4, 2019, a mass shooting took place in Dayton. Ten people were killed, including the perpetrator; and twenty-seven were injured.

Sister cities

Dayton's sister cities are:
Augsburg, Germany
Holon, Israel
Monrovia, Liberia
Ōiso, Japan
Rushmoor, England
Sarajevo, Bosnia and Herzegovina

Notable people

See also 

 List of mayors of Dayton, Ohio
 List of people from Dayton, Ohio
 List of U.S. cities with large Black populations
 National Aviation Hall of Fame
 Politics of Dayton, Ohio
 USS Dayton, 2 ships

Explanatory notes

References

Further reading

 Conover, Charlotte Reeve. Dayton, Ohio : an intimate history (1995) online
 Drury, Augustus Waldo. History of the City of Dayton and Montgomery County, Ohio (S. J. Clarke Publishing Company, 1909). online
 Funk, Nellis R. A Pictorial History of the Great Dayton Flood, March 25, 26, 27, 1913 (1913) online; a primary source
 Millsap, Adam. "How the Gem city lost its luster and how it can get it back: A case study of Dayton, Ohio." Mercatus Research Paper (2017). online
 Pocock, Emil. "Popular Roots of Jacksonian Democracy: The Case of Dayton, Ohio, 1815-1830." Journal of the Early Republic 9.4 (1989): 489–515. online
 Sealander, Judith. Grand Plans: Business Progressivism and Social Change in Ohio's Miami Valley, 1890-1929 (1988) on Dayton and surrounding region.
 Sharts, Joseph W. Biography Of Dayton - An Economic Interpretation of Local History (1922) online
 Walker, John T. "Socialism in Dayton, Ohio, 1912 to 1925: Its membership, organization, and demise." Labor History 26.3 (1985): 384–404.
 Watras, Joseph. "The Racial Desegregation of Dayton, Ohio, Public Schools, 1966–2008." Ohio History 117.1 (2010): 93–107. online

External links 

 City website
 Dayton Area Chamber of Commerce
 Greater Dayton CVB

 
1796 establishments in the Northwest Territory
Cities in Greene County, Ohio
Cities in Montgomery County, Ohio
Cities in Ohio
County seats in Ohio
Populated places established in 1796
Wright brothers
World War II Heritage Cities